Pastor Milciades Coronel (9 August 1919 – 19 September 2000) was the chief of the Investigations Department during General Alfredo Stroessner's dictatorship of Paraguay. He is considered by human rights activists, like Martín Almada, to be the most feared torturer of the dictatorship. The discovery of the "Archives of Terror" showed that he was the perpetrator of several human rights violations.

Youth and beginnings 
Born on 9 August 1919, Pastor Coronel was working in the Education and Culture Ministry when he was called by Alfredo Stroessner to reorganize the Investigations Department and turn it into the core of the political security of the regime. Under his command, this police station would become the most feared interrogation center. The "Terror Archives" would show, later on, that most of the torturing, the executing, during the dictatorship, took place in that building.

Director of Investigations Department 
The modernization of the repressive structure of the regime was based on a new system of archiving information and intelligence data, and the subdivision of specialized chores in areas like unions, student centers, borders and political movements. The most important division of all was the division of "Politic and Others" that, since the early 1970s, was under the command of the officer Alberto Buenaventura Cantero. According to torture victims and political prisoners at the time, all of the authors of the human rights violations perpetrated during the dictatorship were officers from that Department. 

Pastor Coronel was also in charge of the Identification Department. That department was responsible for conceding personal documents to the public. This gave him a lot of power and allowed him to expand the institution’s income.

Political career 
Once he gained a considerable amount of money and also a considerable amount of power and influence, he entered the political arena of the Colorado Party. He did it with the support of the "Milicians", a group of his supporters that were from San Estanislao, the city where Pastor Coronel was born. He used to give away little machetes among them, and on special days, he called them the "Macheteros of Santaní".

The murder of Somoza 
During his administration in the Identification Department, the Nicaraguan dictator Anastasio Somoza Debayle fled to Paraguay to avoid prosecution in his own country. Even though Pastor Coronel constantly talked about the complete security in the country, he could not stop the assassination of Somoza by Argentine guerrillas with an RPG-7 in the middle of the Avenida España, in Asunción on 17 September 1980.

Fall of the regime 
The Terror Archives showed indisputably the deceit of the government, when authorities affirmed that they did not know the whereabouts of all the missing activist and prisoners of the time. Those documents were the juridical foundation that led to the trial and the later condemnation of many police torturers, including Pastor Coronel, a millionaire who possessed a lot of power and influence, but was also one of the most hated people in the Stroessner regime.

He was imprisoned a short time after the coup d’état led by General Andrés Rodríguez on 3 February 1989. He would die in prison, without ever regaining his freedom following his imprisonment. He was condemned to twenty five years in prison, for his responsibility and personal involvement on several tortures and murders of political prisoners. Plagued by morbid obesity that caused many metabolic and cardiovascular complications, he died 19 September 2000, still a symbol of the political repression that had characterized Alfredo Stroessner's dictatorship.

Bibliography

External links 
 "El propio Stroessner era el que decidía las ejecuciones"
 Los Archivos del Horror del Operativo Cóndor

1919 births
2000 deaths
Paraguayan anti-communists
Paraguayan people who died in prison custody
People from Asunción
Prisoners who died in Paraguayan detention
Colorado Party (Paraguay) politicians
Alfredo Stroessner